Groome is an English surname and may refer to:

Francis Hindes Groome (1851–1902), British writer about the Romani
Georgia Groome (born 1992), British actress
James Black Groome (1838–1893), governor and US Senator from Maryland
Jay Groome (born 1998), American baseball player
John Groome (disambiguation), multiple people
Micky Groome (born 1951), English musician
Reginald K. Groome (1928–1999), Canadian hotel executive and  Boy Scouts leader
Robert Hindes Groome (1810–1889), English clergyman
Roland Groome (1897–1935), Canadian aviator

See also
Groom (disambiguation)

English-language surnames
Occupational surnames
English-language occupational surnames